The 86th Brigade was a formation of  the British Army. It was originally formed from regular army battalions serving away from home in the British Empire. It was assigned to the 29th Division and served on the Western Front and the Gallipoli Campaign and in Egypt during the First World War.

Order of Battle
The following units served with the brigade at various time during the war:

2nd Battalion, Royal Fusiliers 	
1st Battalion, Lancashire Fusiliers 	
1st Battalion, Royal Munster Fusiliers
1st Battalion, Royal Dublin Fusiliers
2/3rd Battalion, London Regiment – attached 24 September 1915 to January 1916
16th (Service) Battalion, Middlesex Regiment (Public Schools)
1st Battalion, Royal Guernsey Light Infantry
86th Machine Gun Company
86th Trench Mortar Battery

Commanders

References

Infantry brigades of the British Army in World War I